The 2000 United States House of Representatives elections in Ohio were held on Tuesday, November 7, 2000 to elect the 19 U.S. representatives from the state of Ohio, one from each of the state's 19 congressional districts. The elections coincided with the elections of other federal and state offices, including a presidential election and an election to the U.S. Senate

Overview

District 1

General election results

District 2

General election results

District 3

General election results

District 4

General election results

District 5

General election results

District 6

General election results

District 7

General election results

District 8

General election results

District 9

General election results

District 10

General election results

District 11

General election results

District 12

General election results

District 13

General election results

District 14

General election results

District 15

General election results

District 16

General election results

District 17

General election results

District 18

General election results

District 19

General election results

References

2000
Ohio
2000 Ohio elections